The 1964 United States presidential election in Nebraska took place on November 3, 1964, as part of the 1964 United States presidential election. Voters chose five representatives, or electors, to the Electoral College, who voted for president and vice president.

Nebraska was won by incumbent President Lyndon B. Johnson (D–Texas), with 52.61% of the popular vote, against Senator Barry Goldwater (R–Arizona), with 47.39% of the popular vote.

With his win in the state, President Johnson would become the first Democratic presidential candidate since Franklin D. Roosevelt in 1936 to win the state. The Cornhusker State was Johnson's weakest in the Great Plains region, and one of two where he did not win every congressional district, the other being Oklahoma. Senator Goldwater carried the state's 3rd district which encompassed the western half of the state, while Johnson carried the 1st and 2nd in the eastern half. Johnson carried 38 counties to Goldwater's 55. Nebraska weighed in as 17.36% more Republican than the national average.

, this is the last time the Democratic candidate won Nebraska at large, as well as Adams County, Sarpy County, Cass County, Washington County, Saunders County, Gage County, Dixon County, Nemaha County, Richardson County, Boone County, Lincoln County, Polk County, Fillmore County, Johnson County, Cedar County, Buffalo County, Seward County, Hall County, Jefferson County, Thayer County, Webster County, Platte County, Nuckolls County, Clay County, Colfax County, Franklin County, Howard County, Nance County, Logan County, and Kearney County. Douglas County and Lancaster County would not vote Democratic again until 2008. Barack Obama would later win the state's 2nd congressional district in 2008 and received one electoral vote from the state. Joe Biden, Obama's running mate in 2008, did the same in 2020. Nebraska as a whole, however, has remained a safely Republican state, and has voted Republican by double-digits in every subsequent election.

Results

Results by county

See also
 United States presidential elections in Nebraska

References

Nebraska
1964
1964 Nebraska elections